Chlorurus perspicillatus, known officially by the English name, spectacled parrotfish, given by professional ichthyologists and Ichthyology or uhu-uliuli as a well-established Hawaiian name for many hundreds of years, is a species of marine fish in the family Scaridae. Found only in Eastern Central Pacific Hawaiian Islands, it inhabits lagoons and seaward reefs

Young fish are brown with white dots and three white stripes and can reach a maximum size of 24 inches length when fully grown.

It has been known to hybridize with Chlorurus sordidus.

References

perspicillatus
Taxa named by Franz Steindachner
Fish described in 1879